HMS Fawn, pennant number A325, was a Bulldog-class hydrographic survey ship of the British Royal Navy. On 20 November 1988 she was involved in an incident with a Guatemalan gunboat in Guatemalan waters while HMS Fawn was carrying out peaceful and legitimate hydrographic survey work in the high seas in the Gulf of Honduras. A protest was made to the Guatemalan Government. Fawn was paid off in October 1991 and sold to interests in West Germany to become an offshore support vessel of the West African and Chinese coasts under the name Red Fulmar.

 

Bulldog-class survey vessels
Survey vessels of the Royal Navy
1968 ships